Viviana Iuliana Bejinariu (born 1 January 1994) is a Romanian rower. She was part of the team that won the gold medal in the women's eight competition at the 2017 World Rowing Championships in Sarasota, Florida.

References

External links
 
 
 
 
 Viviana-Iuliana Bejinariu at 2018 European Rowing Championships

1994 births
Living people
Romanian female rowers
World Rowing Championships medalists for Romania
Rowers at the 2020 Summer Olympics